Winston Davis (born 14 September 1961) is a Kittitian cricketer. He played in five first-class and two List A matches for the Leeward Islands in 1991/92 and 1992/93.

See also
 List of Leeward Islands first-class cricketers

References

External links
 

1961 births
Living people
Kittitian cricketers
Leeward Islands cricketers